The Unitary Platform (PU) is a Venezuelan opposition political alliance made up of civil society, trade unions, retired military personnel, political parties, and deputies of the 2016–2021 National Assembly.

History 
On April 21, 2021, Juan Guaidó presented a document on a new opposition alliance called the Unitary Platform, which integrates civil society, trade unions, retired military personnel, political parties and deputies of the National Assembly elected for the period 2016-2021 with more inclusive and comprehensive features. At the end of June 2021, the National Electoral Council (CNE) rehabilitated the Democratic Unity Roundtable (MUD) as a national political party in order to participate in 2021 regional elections. On August 31, 2021, the MUD rejoined the Venezuelan electoral landscape with the support of the Unitary Platform, but with the use of the MUD card and the coalition is rehabilitated by the CNE and the political parties belonging to the FAVL with the intention of participating in the regionals on November 21.

Members 
The following parties are part of the Unitary Platform:

See also 

 Democratic Unity Roundtable
 Democratic Alliance (Venezuela)
 Free Venezuela Broad Front

Notes

References 

Political parties established in 2021
Political party alliances in Venezuela